The following events occurred in June 1953:

June 1, 1953 (Monday)
 The first Bergen International Festival opens in Norway, exactly 55 years after the first music festival in Norway Edvard Grieg's "Bergen Music Festival".
Died: Alex James, 51, Scottish football, from cancer

June 2, 1953 (Tuesday)
 Plzeň uprising: Three days of riots in Czechoslovakia, over government currency reforms, come to an end.
The coronation of Queen Elizabeth II as Queen of the United Kingdom, Canada, Australia, New Zealand, South Africa, Pakistan, and Ceylon, takes place at Westminster Abbey. At the Queen's own insistence, the ceremony is televised. In the Coronation Honours, recipients of honours include politician Lord Woolton (created a viscount), actor John Gielgud, cricketer Jack Hobbs, jockey Gordon Richards and Rhodesian Prime Minister Roy Welensky (knighted) and Violet Bonham Carter (made a Dame).
The Giro d'Italia cycle race is won by Fausto Coppi.
In the United States, a special election is held in South Carolina's 4th congressional district for a new representative to replace the late Joseph R. Bryson. Democrat Robert T. Ashmore is elected.

June 3, 1953 (Wednesday)
The first Canada Cup golf competition, held at Montreal, Quebec, is won by the team from Argentina, comprising Antonio Cerdá and Roberto De Vicenzo.
Died: Florence Price, 66, African-American classical composer, pianist, organist and music teacher, of a stroke

June 4, 1953 (Thursday)
The Italian cargo ship Serapide sinks off Cape Palos, Spain. Its 24 crew members are rescued by the Spanish naval destroyer Legazpi.

June 5, 1953 (Friday)
A new constitution takes effect in Denmark, following the previous month's referendum (see May 1953).
Died:
Bill Tilden, 60, American tennis champion, of heart problems
Roland Young, 65, English actor, best known for his role as "Cosmo Topper"

June 6, 1953 (Saturday)
Born: June Yamagishi, Japanese guitarist, in Ise, Mie

June 7, 1953 (Sunday)
 In the Italian general election, the Christian Democracy party wins a plurality in both legislative houses. Alcide De Gasperi continues as prime minister.
The US tanker ship Phoenix collides with the Pan Massachusetts in the Delaware River near Delaware City, Delaware. The Phoenix sinks, while both ships catch fire and are lost.

June 8, 1953 (Monday)
 Austria and the Soviet Union form diplomatic relations.

 Flint–Worcester tornado outbreak sequence: A tornado kills 115 people in Flint, Michigan (the last in the United States to claim more than 100 lives until the 2011 Joplin tornado).
 The US radio drama serial Family Skeleton is broadcast for the first time, on CBS.
Born: Ivo Sanader, the "Ćaća", Prime minister of Croatia, in Dugobabe, near Split

June 9, 1953 (Tuesday)
 A general election is held in the Canadian province of British Columbia. The minority government formed in the previous year by W. A. C. Bennett and the Social Credit Party obtains an overall majority.
 In the United States, CIA Technical Services Staff head Sidney Gottlieb approves the use of LSD in an MKUltra subproject.
 Flint–Worcester tornado outbreak sequence: A tornado spawned from the same storm system as the Flint tornado hits in Worcester, Massachusetts, United States, killing 94.
A boiler explosion occurs on the Chesapeake and Ohio Railway's 2-6-6-6 engine, “Allegheny”, number 1642. Three crew members are killed by the blast, which is blamed on a faulty component.

June 10, 1953 (Wednesday)
 Deputy British Prime Minister Anthony Eden undergoes a biliary tract operation, carried out by Dr. Richard Cattell at the New England Baptist Hospital in Boston, Massachusetts, United States.

June 11, 1953 (Thursday)
Born: José Bové, French farmer and politician, in Talence

June 12, 1953 (Friday)

June 13, 1953 (Saturday)

 A bloodless coup d'état takes place in Colombia, and General Gustavo Rojas Pinilla takes over the government.
 Hungarian Prime Minister Mátyás Rákosi is replaced by Imre Nagy.
The 53rd US Open golf tournament is won by Ben Hogan.

June 14, 1953 (Sunday)
The Czechoslovak presidential election, brought about by the death of Klement Gottwald (see March 1953) is won by the country's prime minister, Antonín Zápotocký.
A general election is held in Liechtenstein. The Progressive Citizens' Party wins a small majority, and continues to govern in coalition with the Patriotic Union. 
The 24 Hours of Le Mans motor race is won by Tony Rolt and Duncan Hamilton.
Lightning strikes Aeroflot Flight 229, an Ilyushin Il-12, during a domestic flight in the Soviet Union. The aircraft enters an uncontrolled dive and loses its outer wing panels when the crew attempts to recover. The aircraft crashes into a wooded hillside northeast of Zugdidi in the Georgian Soviet Socialist Republic and catches fire, killing all 18 people on board.
Died: Nato Vachnadze, 49 Georgian film actress, killed in the crash of Aeroflot Flight 229

June 15, 1953 (Monday)
The New York City Transit Authority is created.
Died: Henry Scattergood, American cricketer (b. 1877)

June 16, 1953 (Tuesday)
 East German uprising of 1953: Strike action by construction workers begins in East Berlin, leading to a wider uprising against the government.
 Norwegian cruise ship Brand V runs aground at Ålesund and is a total loss. All passengers and crew are rescued.

June 17, 1953 (Wednesday)

 The uprising of 1953 in East Germany is brutally suppressed; June 17 was celebrated in West Germany as German Unity Day until after German reunification occurred. Bertolt Brecht continues with rehearsals for the first production of Erwin Strittmatter's Katzgraben: Szenen aus dem Bauernleben with the Berliner Ensemble, inspiring a disapproving Günter Grass's Die Plebejer proben den Aufstand (1966).

June 18, 1953 (Thursday)
 Egypt declares itself a republic, after last year's revolution.
 Tachikawa air disaster: A United States Air Force Douglas C-124 Globemaster II crashes just after takeoff from Tachikawa Airfield near Tokyo, Japan, killing all 129 people on board in the worst air crash in history at this time and the first with a confirmed death toll exceeding 100.
The 3rd Berlin International Film Festival opens in West Germany.
Died: René Fonck, 59, French aviator, top Allied World War I flying ace (stroke)

June 19, 1953 (Friday)
The Baton Rouge bus boycott, often regarded as the start of the civil rights movement, begins in the United States.
In Pakistan, the Punjab Disturbances Court of Inquiry is appointed, under Muhammad Munir and Malik Rustam Kayani, to investigate the Lahore riots (see March 1953).
The 32nd annual NCAA Track and Field Championships open in Lincoln, Nebraska, lasting for two days.
Died:
Harold Cazneaux, Australian photographer (b. 1878)
Julius Rosenberg, 35, and Ethel Rosenberg, 37, American communist spies (executed)
Norman Ross, 58, American Olympic swimmer and radio personality sometimes known as "The Big Moose" and "Uncle Normie"

June 20, 1953 (Saturday)
An unsuccessful American Karakoram expedition, led by Charles Snead Houston, arrives at the base of K2.
Born: Ulrich Mühe, German actor (d. 2007)

June 21, 1953 (Sunday)
In the final of the first Spanish football cup competition, held in Madrid, CF Barcelona defeat Club Atlético de Bilbao.
Born: Benazir Bhutto, Prime Minister of Pakistan, in Karachi, daughter of Zulfikar Ali Bhutto and Begum Nusrat Ispahani (died 2007)

June 22, 1953 (Monday)
The Government of Nepal hosts a reception for members of the Mount Everest expedition, at which Tenzing Norgay is presented with a prize of ten thousand rupees, while Edmund Hillary and John Hunt are given jewelled kukri and others jewelled caskets. The Government of India announces the creation of a new Gold Medal for civilian gallantry, of which Hunt, Hillary and Tenzing are to be the first recipients.
Born: Cyndi Lauper, American singer, songwriter, and actress, in New York City

June 23, 1953 (Tuesday)
The first round-trip across the continental United States to be carried out between sunrise and sunset is completed by Lieutenant Commander George H. Whisler, Jr., of U.S. Navy Air Transport Squadron 31 (VR-31), departing Naval Air Station Norfolk, Virginia, in a Grumman F9F-6 Cougar, and finally arriving at Naval Air Station North Island, California. He then takes off from North Island in a Douglas F3D-2 Skyknight, and finally lands at Naval Air Station Norfolk at 19:21 local time.
Died: Albert Gleizes, 71, French artist, theoretician and philosopher

June 24, 1953 (Wednesday)
New US television station KOBR begins broadcasting from Roswell, New Mexico.
Born: Fátima Langa, Mozambican writer, in Bahanine (died 2017)

June 25, 1953 (Thursday)
 The 1953 Northern Kyushu flood begins, lasting until June 29 and eventually causing 771 deaths and affecting about 1 million people.

June 26, 1953 (Friday)
 Lavrentiy Beria, Soviet internal affairs minister and former NKVD leader, is arrested, accused of espionage.
 Indian director Vedantam Raghavayya's film Devadasu, with Akkineni Nageswara Rao in the title role, is released in a Telugu version.
The 10-gross register ton, US motor vessel Mary Pat is destroyed by fire in Bristol Bay off the coast of the Territory of Alaska, United States.

June 27, 1953 (Saturday)
The final of the 1953 English Greyhound Derby is held at White City Stadium, London, and is won by Daws Dancer.

June 28, 1953 (Sunday)
The U.S. Women's Open golf tournament is won by Betsy Rawls, after a play-off against Jackie Pung.
The final match of the 1953 Taça de Portugal football tournament is played at the Estádio Nacional in Oeiras Municipality, Portugal. Benfica emerge winners for the seventh time, defeating Porto 5–0.
The III Grand Prix de Rouen-les-Essarts, a combined Formula One and Formula Two motor race, is won by Giuseppe Farina of Italy.

June 29, 1953 (Monday)
J. Brooke Mosley is elected Coadjutor Bishop of Delaware in the Episcopal Church, at a special convention in Wilmington, Delaware, United States.
Ahmet Ertegun of Atlantic Records brings together the first line-up of the US singing group that later becomes The Drifters. After a recording session in New York City, he asks lead singer Clyde McPhatter to put together a different backing group.

June 30, 1953 (Tuesday)
 The first Chevrolet Corvette is built, at Flint, Michigan, United States.
 The irst roll-on/roll-off ferry crossing of the English Channel takes place, from Dover to Boulogne.
The final of the 1953 Copa del Generalísimo football competition takes place in Madrid, Spain, and is won by Real Madrid FC.
 Airey Neave, the first British prisoner-of-war to escape from Colditz Castle during World War II, is elected as a Conservative MP at the Abingdon by-election, brought about by the elevation to the peerage of his predecessor, Ralph Glyn.
Died: Elsa Beskow, 79, Swedish author and illustrator of children's books

References

1953
1953-06
1953-06